Charles R. "Chuck" Gipp (born November 30, 1947) is an American politician in the state of Iowa. A Republican, he served in the Iowa House of Representatives for the 31st district from 1990 to 2003 and for the 16th district from 2003 to 2009. He was the majority leader in the Iowa House from 2003 to 2007, when the Democrats recaptured the legislature in the 2006 elections.

Early life 
Gipp was born on November 30, 1947, in Decorah, Iowa. His parents were Alvin and Jeanette Gipp. He graduated from Thomas Roberts High School in 1966 and received his bachelor's of arts degree from Luther College in 1977. The next year, he married J. Ranae Keoppel. The couple had two children: Alison and Barrett.

Political career 
Gipp served as the chair of the Winneshiek County Republicans from 1980 to 1990, chair of the Winneshiek County Solid Waste Commission from 1981 to 1990 and as a member of the Iowa Brown Swiss Association, the Farm Bureau and the National Federation of Independent Business. He was first elected to the Iowa House of Representatives in the 1990 general election for the 31st district. He served on several committees in the Iowa House: the state government committee and the transportation committee. He also served on the Transportation, Infrastructure, and Capitals Appropriations Subcommittee. He was the assistant majority leader of the Iowa House from 1993 to 1994 and majority whip of the Iowa House from 1995 to 1996.

Gipp was re-elected in 2006 with 5,782 votes (59%), defeating Democratic opponent Thomas Hansen. He did not contest the 2008 election and was succeeded by a Democrat, John W. Beard.

Gipp is the director of the Iowa Department of Natural Resources (DNR). He had been the deputy director since August 5, 2011. Before that he was the administrator of the Soil Conservation Division for the Iowa Department of Agriculture and Land Stewardship. He became the Director of the Iowa DNR after his predecessor, Roger Lande, resigned on May 25, 2012.

References

External links
Gipp on Project Vote Smart
Gipp's Capitol Web Address

Republican Party members of the Iowa House of Representatives
State cabinet secretaries of Iowa
Living people
1947 births
People from Decorah, Iowa
Luther College (Iowa) alumni